Koševo City Stadium (Bosnian, Croatian and Serbian: Gradski stadion Koševo / Градски стадион Кошево), also Koševo Olympic Stadium or Stadium Asim Ferhatović - Hase (Stadion Asim Ferhatović Hase / Стадион Асим Ферхатовић Хасе) is a multi-purpose stadium located in the Koševo neighborhood of Sarajevo, Bosnia and Herzegovina. Its official name is Olimpijski stadion Koševo – Asim Ferhatović-Hase. Stadium is opened by the city, and leased on longterm basis by football club FK Sarajevo. The club proposed the new name for its sporting and football events, in honor to its former footballer and club's legend, Asim Ferhatović - Hase. It hosted the opening ceremony of the 1984 Winter Olympics.

Construction
The stadium was opened in the year 1947. In 1984, it was reconstructed for the 1984 Winter Olympics, and is therefore often called Olympic Stadium. In July 2004, FK Sarajevo proposed the new name for sporting and football events, in honor to its former player and club's legend from the 1960s, Asim Ferhatović - Hase.

Today, the total capacity of Koševo is 34,500 seats, and up to 70,000 for musical and various public events, such as U2's concert as part of their PopMart Tour in 1997 and Dino Merlin's Burek tour in 2004 and Hotel Nacional in 2015, or hosting of papal pastoral visitations by Pope John Paul II between 12–13 April 1997 and Pope Francis on 6 June 2015. It was also the home stadium of the Bosnia and Herzegovina national football team.

History
Construction works started in 1947. The stadium was literally buried into a local hill thus merging with its natural surroundings. In 1950, a pitch and a tartan track were also added. The first international football match, between Yugoslavia and Turkey, was played in 1954.

In 1966, the stadium hosted an athletic championship for the Balkans. It was renovated for that occasion. A new administration building was built, so were the new locker rooms and a restaurant. A modern scoreboard and new lighting were also provided.

The stadium was renovated for the third time after the Bosnian War, in 1998. By adding the chairs on every stand the seating capacity of the stadium was reduced to 34,500.

Throughout its football history, the stadium was usually a home ground for FK Sarajevo's and FK Željezničar's international matches. The Sarajevo audience witnessed many great matches against Europe's finest clubs such as Manchester United, Dynamo Kyiv, Derby County, Basel, Hamburger SV, Newcastle United, Celtic etc.

The stadium's largest attendance was recorded in a 1981–82 Yugoslav First League match between Sarajevo and Željezničar. Allegedly, up to 60,000 people attended the game, though the exact number was never officially published.

In April 2021, the stadium was leased to FK Sarajevo for operating the stadium for the next 30 to 45 years, making the stadium FK Sarajevo's de facto property.

1984 Winter Olympics
On 7 February 1984, the Asim Ferhatović Hase stadium hosted the opening ceremonies of the 1984 Winter Olympics for which it was thoroughly renovated and expanded. About 50,000 people attended the ceremonies. The west stand held 18,500 seating places at that time.

Notable events

International Football Matches

Notable Club Friendlies

Concerts
Zdravko Čolić - 7 September 1978 (Putujući zemljotres Tour, the concert got stopped midway through due to heavy rain)
U2 - 23 September 1997 (PopMart Tour)
Dino Merlin - 31 July 2000 (Sredinom Tour, guests: Adi Lukovac & Ornamenti, Ivana Banfić, Amir Bjelanović Tula, Miro Asotić)
Dino Merlin - 31 July 2004 (Burek Tour, guests: Željko Joksimović, Ivana Banfić, Nina Badrić, Edo Zanki, Almir Hukelić, Gani Tamir)
Bijelo dugme - 15 June 2005
Haris Džinović - 23 June 2007 (guests: Halid Bešlić, Hari Varešanović, Željko Joksimović, Enis Bešlagić)
Moj ummete 2007 - 28 July 2007
Dino Merlin - 19 July 2008 (Ispočetka Tour, guests: Hari Varešanović, Vesna Zmijanac, Tony Cetinski, Eldin Huseinbegović, Ivana Banfić, Baby Dooks, Elvedin Krilić)
Hari Mata Hari - 10 August 2009 (Sreća Tour, guests: Nina Badrić, Dino Merlin, Halid Bešlić, Dražen Žerić Žera, Eldin Huseinbegović)
Željko Joksimović - 12 June 2010 (guests: Halid Bešlić, Hari Varešanović, Jelena Tomašević)
Zdravko Čolić - 31 July 2010 (Kad pogledaš me preko ramena Tour, guests: Dino Merlin, Nikša Bratoš)
Halid Bešlić - 22 June 2013 (Romanija Tour, guests: Haris Džinović, Željko Joksimović, Enes Begović, Dženan Jahić, Viki Miljković, Colonia, Enis Bešlagić)
Dino Merlin - 25 July 2015 (Hotel Nacional Tour)
Željko Joksimović - 19 August 2016 
Marija Šerifović - 1 July 2018 (guests: Jelena Karleuša)

Other events

Pope John Paul II celebrated a mass in the stadium in front of 50,000 people - 13 April 1997
Pope Francis celebrated a mass in the stadium in front of 67,000 people - 6 June 2015

See also
List of football stadiums in Bosnia and Herzegovina

References

External links

Soccerway
World Stadiums

Venues of the 1984 Winter Olympics
FK Sarajevo
Architecture in Bosnia and Herzegovina
k
Football venues in Yugoslavia
Athletics (track and field) venues in Yugoslavia
National stadiums
Olympic stadiums
Sports venues in Sarajevo
Centar, Sarajevo
Music venues in Bosnia and Herzegovina
1947 establishments in Bosnia and Herzegovina
Sports venues completed in 1947